

Collegiate chapters 

A list of the collegiate chapters of Alpha Chi Sigma (ΑΧΣ) professional chemistry fraternity with active chapters in bold and inactive chapters in italic.

References

Alpha Chi Sigma
chapters